Little Star is a Philippine television drama musical series broadcast by GMA Network. Directed by Maryo J. de los Reyes, it stars Nicki Castro in the title role, Jennylyn Mercado, Mark Anthony Fernandez, Lovi Poe and Paolo Contis. It premiered on October 25, 2010 on the network's Haponalo line up replacing Trudis Liit. The series concluded on February 11, 2011 with a total of 80 episodes. It was replaced by Nita Negrita in its timeslot.

Cast and characters

Main cast
 Jennylyn Mercado as Helen Estrella
 Mark Anthony Fernandez as Dave de Leon
 Lovi Poe as Gwyneth Cordova
 Paolo Contis as Lester Lumibao
 Nicky Castro as Niño Estrella

Recurring cast
 Sarah Lahbati as Paula Estrella
 Divina Valencia as Madame Divina de Leon
 Nina Kodaka as Aurora Wang
 Jiro Manio as Joross
 Allan Paule as Gener Estrella
 Maricel Morales as Ruby
 Rich Asuncion as Bianca Valerio
 Shamaine Buencamino as Cecilla "Cecile" Cordova
 Orlando Sol as Don Rico
 Hershey de Guzman as Rachel
 Mymy Davao as Madame Elle
 Miggs Cuaderno as Niño

Ratings
According to AGB Nielsen Philippines' Mega Manila People/Individual television ratings, the pilot episode of Little Star earned a 5.6% rating. While the final episode scored a 7.7% rating.

Accolades

References

External links
 

2010 Philippine television series debuts
2011 Philippine television series endings
Filipino-language television shows
GMA Network drama series
Television series by TAPE Inc.
Television shows set in the Philippines